The Faïencerie de Gien is a faience (or earthenware) factory in Gien, France. It was founded in 1821 by Thomas Edme Hulm.

References

External links
Official website

Ceramics manufacturers of France
1821 establishments in France
Companies based in Centre-Val de Loire
Faience of France